Kolonnage Mayura Sampath Perera (born 30 October 1965) is a Sri Lankan professional football player and manager.

Career
He was a player and captain for Sri Lanka national football team. Perera helped Sri Lanka win the 1995 South Asian Gold Cup.

Since 2004 until 2006 he coached the Sri Lanka national football team. In 2008, he worked with Ratnam SC. In 2009, he again became the head coach of the Sri Lanka national team. In 2010-2011 he trained Don Bosco SC. Since 2012 until 2013 he coached the Sri Lanka national team. Since 2014 he is a head coach of Air Force SC.

Honours

Sri Lanka
 SAFF Championship: 1995

References

External links

Profile at Soccerpunter.com

1965 births
Living people
Sri Lankan footballers
Sri Lanka international footballers
Association football defenders
Sri Lankan football managers
Sri Lanka national football team managers
Place of birth missing (living people)
Air Force SC players
Sri Lanka Football Premier League players